Neapolis (Punic: Qart Hadasht) meaning "New City", was an ancient city of Sardinia founded by the Carthaginians in the sixth century BC, and apparently one of the most considerable places on that island. It was situated on the west coast, at the southern extremity of the Gulf of Oristano, at the present-day località of Santa Maria di Nabui, in the comune of Guspini, Province of Medio Campidano.

The Itineraries place Neapolis 60 miles from Sulci (in modern Sant'Antioco) and 18 from Othoca (modern Santa Giusta near Oristano), both also Phoenician settlements. (Itin. Ant. p. 84.) It is noticed by Pliny as one of the most important towns in Sardinia; and its name is found also in Ptolemy and the Itineraries. (Plin. iii. 7. s. 13; Ptol. iii. 3. § 2; Itin. Ant. l. c.; Tab. Peut.; Geogr. Rav. v. 26.) Its ruins are still visible at the mouth of the river Pabillonis, where that stream forms a great estuary or lagoon, called the Stagno di Marceddi, and present considerable remains of ancient buildings as well as the vestiges of a Roman road and aqueduct. The spot is marked by an ancient church called Santa Maria di Nabui. (De la Marmora, Voy. en Sardaigne, vol. ii. p. 357.)

The Aquae Neapolitanae mentioned by Ptolemy as well as in the Itinerary, which places them at a considerable distance inland, on the road from Othoca to Caralis (modern Cagliari), are certainly the mineral sources now known as the Bagni di Sardara, on the high road from Cagliari to Oristano. (Itin. Ant. p. 82; Ptol. iii. 3. § 7; Geogr. Rav. v. 26; De la Marmora, l. c. p. 406.)

See also 
 List of Phoenician cities

References
Miles, Richard. (2010). Carthage Must be Destroyed. p. 75-76 
Van Dommelen, Peter (2002) p. 130–37; (1998) p. 124-5

Former populated places in Sardinia
Archaeological sites in Sardinia
Phoenician colonies in Sardinia